Miguel Gomez (also known as Aztek Escobar; born August 20, 1985) is a Colombian-American actor and rapper. Escobar was the first artist officially signed to Jay-Z's Roc La Familia Label. From 2021 to 2022, he is starring as Ivan Ortiz on CBS crime drama series FBI: Most Wanted.

Biography 

Miguel Gomez was born in Cali Colombia, he went to Clements High School (Sugar Land, TX), graduating in 2003. He played a small role in the music video for Soul Survivor by rapper Young Jeezy in 2005.

Gomez made his television debut in the Miami episode of the FX comedy series Louie. He got his big break in 2014 when he landed the role of Augustin "Gus" Elizalde on the FX drama series The Strain. He first became known to film audiences for his prominent role in the 2015 boxing drama Southpaw.

Before acting, he rapped under the name Aztek Escobar and was the first artist signed by Jay Z's Roc La Familia label. His debut album was to be named Colombian Necktie but the label was dissolved before the album was released.

Television

Discography

Mixtapes
2005: King Of Kings
2006: Rise To Power
2007: Blood In Blood Out
2009: I Swear To God

Promotional singles

References

External links 
 

Roc-A-Fella Records artists
Living people
Underground rappers
1985 births
Colombian hip hop musicians
Colombian male television actors
Gangsta rappers